Talia may refer to:

 Talia (given name)
 Talia (surname)
 Talia, Lebanon, a town
 Talia, South Australia, a locality in the District Council of Elliston
 Talia Station, a pastoral lease in South Australia 
 Talia (grape), an alternative name for the wine grape Trebbiano
 Talia (song), a song by King Princess

See also 
 Taliya, the third largest mobile phone network operator in Iran
 Thalia (disambiguation)